Mount Silverthrone, officially named Silverthrone Mountain, is a mountain in the Pacific Ranges of the Coast Mountains of British Columbia, Canada, located over  northwest of the city of Vancouver and about  west of Mount Waddington, British Columbia, Canada. It is the highest peak in the Ha-Iltzuk Icefield, which is the largest icefield in the Coast Mountains south of the Alaska Panhandle.

Geology
Mount Silverthrone is an eroded lava dome on the northeast edge of a large caldera complex called the Silverthrone Caldera. It lies within the Coast Plutonic Complex, which is the single largest contiguous granite outcropping in the world. The plutonic and metamorphic rocks extend approximately 1,800 kilometers on the coast of British Columbia, southwestern Yukon and southeastern Alaska. In addition, Garibaldi, Meager, Cayley and Silverthrone areas are of recent volcanic origin. The volcanic terrain in the Silverthrone area is very similar to the Mount Meager massif further south. However, there is much more ice.

Mount Silverthrone is perhaps one of the most heavily glaciated volcanic peaks in southwestern British Columbia. The extensive icefields around Mount Silverthrone are receding and are small compared to their former extent, but they are an impressive indication of how much of British Columbia looked 10,000 years or more ago. Silverthrone contains one of the few calderas buried beneath the ice caps of western Canada, another example being Mount Edziza in far northwestern British Columbia.

Skiing and recreation
The first mountaineering visit at Mount Silverthrone was by the famous pioneering climbing group of Don and Phyllis Munday in 1936 by walking up the Klinaklini Glacier from the head of Knight Inlet. Because Silverthrone is heavily glaciated, Don Munday called the mountain "home of the snows".

Skiing on Mount Silverthrone includes skiing on the largest ice field in the southern Coast Mountains, the Ha-Iltzuk Icefield. The easiest access to Mount Silverthrone is by air travel, starting from the rural community of Tatla Lake, landing on the major part of the Ha-Iltzuk Icefield. Air travels can also be made into logging camps at Owikeno Lake to the west or at the start of Knight Inlet to the southwest, followed by long hiking and skiing methods.

See also
 Cascade Volcanoes
 Garibaldi Volcanic Belt
 Pemberton Volcanic Belt
 Cascade Range
 Ha-Iltzuk Icefield
 Volcanism of Canada
 Volcanism of Western Canada

References

External links
 Volcanoes of Canada Garibaldi Volcanic Belt (Silverthrone area)
 Catalogue of Canadian volcanoes - Silverthrone Caldera

Two-thousanders of British Columbia
Volcanoes of British Columbia
Subduction volcanoes
Pleistocene lava domes
Garibaldi Volcanic Belt
Pacific Ranges
Range 2 Coast Land District